Fred Peters may refer to:
 Fred Peters (politician)
 Fred Peters (artist)

See also
 Frederick Peters (disambiguation)